During the 1991–92 Serie A, under the guidance of Fabio Capello, Milan completed a remarkable unbeaten season, a run that eventually totalled 58 games. They finished eight points ahead of Serie A runners-up Juventus. However, it was a disappointing season for Internazionale, who could only manage an eighth-place finish, meaning that 1992–93 would bring no European action for them — something which had been a rare occurrence over the last three decades. Defending champions Sampdoria finished sixth and their last chance of European action for the following season was lost when they were beaten by the Spanish champions Barcelona in the final of the European Cup. Bari, Hellas Verona (the 1985 champions), Cremonese and Ascoli were all relegated.

Teams
Foggia, Hellas Verona, Cremonese and Ascoli had been promoted from Serie B.

Number of teams by region

Personnel and Sponsoring

League table

Results

Top goalscorers

References and sources 

 Almanacco Illustrato del Calcio - La Storia 1898-2004, Panini Edizioni, Modena, September 2005

External links 

 :it:Classifica calcio Serie A italiana 1992 - Italian version with pictures and info.
  - All results on RSSSF Website.

Serie A seasons
Italy
1991–92 in Italian football leagues